Harrison Claiborne Ingram (born November 27, 2002) is an American college basketball player for the Stanford Cardinal of the Pac-12 Conference. He attended St. Mark's School of Texas in Dallas, Texas and was a consensus five-star recruit.

High school career
Ingram attended St. Mark's School of Texas in Dallas, Texas. As a junior, he averaged 19.5 points, 10.9 rebounds and seven assists per game, leading his team to a Southwest Preparatory Conference title. As a senior, Ingram only played seven games, with his team facing multiple COVID-19 pauses, and averaged 22 points, 13 rebounds and 8.4 assists per game. He was named a McDonald's All-American.

Recruiting
Ingram held scholarship offers from several NCAA Division I programs, including Baylor and Kansas, by the time he was a sophomore. A consensus five-star recruit, he committed to playing college basketball for Stanford over offers from Purdue, North Carolina, Michigan, Harvard and Howard.

College career
In his college debut, Ingram scored 16 points and grabbed seven rebounds in a 62–50 win against Tarleton State. On January 11, 2022, he scored 21 points in a 75–69 upset of USC. As a freshman, Ingram averaged 10.5 points, 6.7 rebounds and three assists per game. He was named Pac-12 Freshman of the Year. On March 30, 2022, Ingram declared for the 2022 NBA draft while maintaining his college eligibility.

National team career
Ingram represented the United States at the 2021 FIBA Under-19 World Cup in Latvia. He averaged 4.6 points and 4.1 rebounds per game, helping his team win the gold medal.

Career statistics

College

|-
| style="text-align:left;"| 2021–22
| style="text-align:left;"| Stanford
| 32 || 30 || 31.1 || .388 || .313 || .663 || 6.7 || 3.0 || .9 || .3 || 10.5

Personal life
Ingram is the son of Vera and Tyrous Ingram. His older brother, Will, played basketball for Middlebury at the NCAA Division III level. His parents own 17 McDonald's franchise locations in Dallas–Fort Worth.

References

External links
Stanford Cardinal bio
USA Basketball bio

2002 births
Living people
American men's basketball players
Basketball players from Dallas
McDonald's High School All-Americans
Small forwards
Stanford Cardinal men's basketball players
St. Mark's School (Texas) alumni